Drupadia cineas  is a butterfly in the family Lycaenidae. It was described by Henley Grose-Smith in 1889. It is endemic to Borneo.

References

External links
Drupadia Moore, 1884 at Markku Savela's Lepidoptera and Some Other Life Forms

cineas
Butterflies described in 1889